Westmoreland was launched on the Thames in 1791. She made two voyages as a slave ship, and between them cruized as a privateer for some months. She then traded between Britain and the Mediterranean until he was last listed in 1814.

Career
Although she was launched in 1791, Westmoreland first appeared in Lloyd's Register (LR) only in 1801.

1st Slave voyage (1802–1804): Westmoreland sailed from Liverpool on 14 October 1802. She acquired her slaves in the Gold Coast region and arrived with 149 slaves at Trinidad on 22 November 1803. War with France had resumed while she was on her voyage and Captain Peter Cormack received a letter of marque on 25 July 1803. She left Trinidad on 9 April 1804 and arrived back at Liverpool on 25 May. She had left Liverpool with 24 crew members and she suffered three crew deaths on the voyage.

On her return Westmoreland became a privateer, before reverting to the slave trade.  

Privateer: Captain Thomas Goodall acquired a letter of marque on 11 January 1805. Conception had been sailing from Vera Cruz to Spain with a cargo of 130 tons of sugar, a quantity of dye wood, and 68,000 dollars. Conception arrived at Liverpool on 28 February. As Conception sailed for Liverpool she left Westmoreland in chase of another Spanish vessel.

In late March of early April Lloyd's List reported that a French privateer captured Westmoreland, Goodall, master, after a long engagement. A week and a half later Lloyd's List reported that the French privateer Bon had captured a different .

In June, Westmoreland, Goodall, master, recaptured Eliza and sent her to Liverpool. Eliza had been sailing from Waterford to Newfoundland when a Spanish privateer had captured her off Cape Clear.

2nd slave voyage (1806–1807): Captain Henry Tryer sailed from Liverpool on 6 March 1806. Westmoreland acquired her slaves at Lagos Onim. She arrived at Berbice on 8 August with 218 slaves. She sailed from Berbice on 3 February 1807 and arrived back at Liverpool on 16 April. She had left Liverpool with 33 crew members and she suffered nine crew deaths on the voyage.

Fate
Westmoreland was last listed in 1814.

Citations and references
Citations

References
 

1791 ships
Age of Sail merchant ships of England
Liverpool slave ships
Privateer ships of the United Kingdom